Dover Township may refer to:

Canada 
 Dover Township, Ontario

United States

Arkansas 
 Dover Township, Hot Spring County, Arkansas, in Hot Spring County, Arkansas
 Dover Township, Pope County, Arkansas

Iowa 
 Dover Township, Fayette County, Iowa

Kansas
Dover Township, Shawnee County, Kansas

Michigan 
 Dover Township, Lake County, Michigan
 Dover Township, Lenawee County, Michigan
 Dover Township, Otsego County, Michigan

Minnesota 
 Dover Township, Olmsted County, Minnesota

Missouri 
 Dover Township, Lafayette County, Missouri

New Jersey 
 Dover Township, New Jersey, now Toms River Township

Ohio 
 Dover Township, Athens County, Ohio
 Dover Township, Cuyahoga County, Ohio, defunct
 Dover Township, Fulton County, Ohio
 Dover Township, Tuscarawas County, Ohio
 Dover Township, Union County, Ohio

Pennsylvania 
 Dover Township, York County, Pennsylvania

Township name disambiguation pages